Thomas Bibb (May 8, 1783 – September 20, 1839) was the second governor of the US state of Alabama and served from 1820 to 1821. He was the president of the Alabama Senate when his brother, Governor William Wyatt Bibb, died in office on July 10, 1820, as a result of a fall from a horse. By his senatorial office and under the state constitution, Thomas Bibb took over as governor for the remainder of his brother's term. He did not seek election as governor but later served in the Alabama House of Representatives.

He was born in Amelia County, Virginia, in 1783. He grew up in Georgia before he moved to what later became Alabama. He was married to Parmelia Thompson from 1809 to his death on September 20, 1839.

Bibb owned Belle Mina, a forced-labor farm and plantation house in Belle Mina, Alabama.

He was an ancestor of James C. Gardner, a Louisiana politician who served as the mayor of Shreveport from 1954 to 1958. Julia Pleasants and David Creswell, Gardner's maternal great-grandparents, married in 1854 at Bibb's columned plantation house, Belle Mina, in Limestone County near Huntsville, Alabama

References

"Alabama Governors: Thomas Bibb," Alabama Department of Archives and History
Political Graveyard
History of Alabama and Dictionary of Alabama Biography, Volume 3, by Thomas McAdory Owen

1783 births
1839 deaths
People from Amelia County, Virginia
Governors of Alabama
Deaths from pneumonia in Alabama
Alabama Democratic-Republicans
Alabama state senators
Democratic-Republican Party state governors of the United States
19th-century American politicians